This is a list of chairmen (speakers) of the Supreme Council of the Altai Republic of Russia:

This is a list of chairmen (speakers) of the State Assembly of the Altai Republic:

Sources

Lists of legislative speakers in Russia
Politics of the Altai Republic